Scythris hermanusensis is a moth of the family Scythrididae. It was described by Bengt Å. Bengtsson in 2014. It is found in Western Cape, South Africa.

References

Endemic moths of South Africa
hermanusensis
Moths described in 2014